Kuhpayeh-e Gharbi Rural District is a rural district (dehestan) in the Central District of Abyek County, Qazvin Province, Iran. At the 2006 census, its population was 4,157, in 1,227 families.  The rural district has 17 villages.

References 

Rural Districts of Qazvin Province
Abyek County